Stephen George Simpson is an American mathematician whose research concerns the foundations of mathematics, including work in mathematical logic, recursion theory, and Ramsey theory. He is known for his extensive development of the field of reverse mathematics founded by Harvey Friedman, in which the goal is to determine which axioms are needed to prove certain mathematical theorems. He has also argued for the benefits of finitistic mathematical systems, such as primitive recursive arithmetic, which do not include actual infinity.

A conference in honor of Simpson's 70th birthday was organized in May 2016.

Education
Simpson graduated in 1966 from Lehigh University with a B.A. (summa cum laude) and M.A. in mathematics. He earned a Ph.D. from the Massachusetts Institute of Technology in 1971, with a dissertation entitled Admissible Ordinals and Recursion Theory and supervised by Gerald Sacks.

Career
After short-term positions at Yale University, the University of California, Berkeley, and the University of Oxford, Simpson became an assistant professor at the Pennsylvania State University in 1975. At Penn State, he was Raymond N. Shibley professor from 1987 to 1992.

In 2016, his wife, computer scientist Padma Raghavan, moved from Penn State to Vanderbilt University to become vice provost for research, and Simpson followed her, becoming a research professor at Vanderbilt.

Selected publications
.
.
.
.
. 2nd ed., 2009, .

References

External links
Home page at PSU
Google scholar profile

Year of birth missing (living people)
Living people
20th-century American mathematicians
Lehigh University alumni
Massachusetts Institute of Technology School of Science alumni
Pennsylvania State University faculty
Vanderbilt University faculty
21st-century American mathematicians